Jelena Janković was the defending champion, but lost in the third round to Akgul Amanmuradova.

Kim Clijsters defeated Maria Sharapova in the final, 2–6, 7–6(7–4), 6–2, despite Sharapova having three match points. It was Sharapova's second final defeat in as many weeks, having lost the Stanford final to Victoria Azarenka just two weeks earlier.

Ana Ivanovic, ranked a lowly World No. 62 entering the tournament, upset Azarenka in the first round, having trailed 2–6, 2–5 before fighting back to win the match, 2–6, 7–6(8–6), 6–2. She then went on to make her third semi-final of the year, being forced to retire against Clijsters after injuring her foot early in the match.

Seeds
The top eight seeds receive a bye into the second round.

Main draw

Finals

Top half

Section 1

Section 2

Bottom half

Section 3

Section 4

References
 Main Draw
 Qualifying Draw

Women's Open - Singles